Freedom and Solidarity (SaS) is a liberal political party in Slovakia. Established in 2009, SaS is led by its founder and economist Richard Sulík, who designed Slovakia's flat tax system. It generally holds libertarian or anti-statist positions. After the 2020 Slovak parliamentary election, the party lost several seats in the National Council but was part of the coalition government with For the People and We Are Family.

Sas is Eurosceptic, supports civil libertarian policies including advocating drug liberalisation and same-sex marriage, and has an economic liberal platform based on the ideas of the Austrian School. The party launched a campaign called Referendum 2009 to hold a referendum on reforming and cutting the cost of politics. The Freedom and Solidarity party makes heavy use of the Internet, such as fighting the 2010 parliamentary election through Facebook and Twitter, with the party having 68,000 fans on Facebook by the election.

SaS narrowly failed to cross the 5% threshold at the 2009 European Parliament election but came third, winning 22 seats, at the 2010 parliamentary election. It became part of the four-party centre-right coalition government, holding four cabinet positions, with Richard Sulík elected the Speaker of the National Council. In the 2012 parliamentary election, the party suffered a major setback and lost half its 22 seats, and held four positions in the government of Slovakia before the election. In the 2019 European Parliament election, the party returned two Members of the European Parliament (MEPs). The party is member of the European Conservatives and Reformists Party (ECR Party). Sulík left the Alliance of Liberals and Democrats for Europe (ALDE) group in the European Parliament to sit with the European Conservatives and Reformists (ECR) on 2 October 2014.

History

Beginnings 
Richard Sulík was special adviser to Ivan Mikloš and Ján Počiatek, the country's two Ministers of Finance, with whom he worked to simplify the tax system and implement Slovakia's 19% flat tax. He announced his intention to found Freedom and Solidarity on 10 October 2008, calling for a party dedicated to economic freedom and questioning the commitment of the Slovak Democratic and Christian Union – Democratic Party (SDKÚ–DS) to that objective. Analysts cited a lack of any liberal party in the country. After securing the 10,000 signatures required to found a party, SaS made its public debut in February 2009, ahead of the European Parliament election in June 2009. The party set publicly declared goals of entering the National Council in 2010 and entering government in 2014.

At SaS's founding congress in Bratislava on 28 February 2009, Sulík was elected as Chairman and Jana Kiššová as General Manager.
SaS selected economist Ján Oravec, to be its candidate for the 2009 European Parliament election. The party supported the SDKÚ–DS candidate Iveta Radičová in the 2009 presidential election in March and April, but she was defeated in the second round. With others, Sulík was approached by Declan Ganley to join the Libertas.eu alliance of Eurosceptic parties for the European elections but turned down the invitation in order to remain independent. While he was also a sceptic of the Lisbon Treaty and more generally a critic of European intransparency and bureaucracy, he did not share the isolationist position of Libertas. In the 2009 European Parliament election, SaS received 4.7% of the votes, just missing the 5% election threshold; SDKÚ–DS accused SaS of unnecessarily furthering the fragmentation of the political right in Slovakia. In the 2009 regional elections, SaS won one seat in Bratislava.

2009 referendum and 2010 parliamentary election 

Later in 2009, SaS promoted a referendum striving for major cuts to politicians' privileges. The demands include downsizing the Slovak parliament from 150 to 100 MPs, scrapping their immunity from criminal prosecution and limits to be placed on the public finances spent on government officials' cars. Furthermore, they demand that the radio and television market should be further liberalized, abolishing concessionary fees, and public officials' right to comment and reply to media coverage should be removed from the press law. In January 2010, SaS announced that by the end of 2009 it had managed to collect the 350,000 signatures needed in order to call a referendum.  SaS forwarded the signatures to the Slovak president Ivan Gašparovič, requesting him to schedule the referendum for the date of the parliamentary election on 12 June 2010.

In March 2010, people reported Sulík to the police for the content of the manifesto for the 2010 parliamentary election, arguing that the party's manifesto commitment to legalisation of cannabis constituted the criminal offence of 'spread of addiction'. This was thrown out by the prosecutors, who refused to press charges. The party's candidates were the most open about the state of their personal wealth. In the election to the National Council, SaS received 12.1%, coming third, and won 22 seats. The party was the only one in opposition that took votes from Direction – Social Democracy (Smer–SD), although it was estimated that more of its votes came from former SDKÚ–DS voters.

The party entered into coalition negotiations with three centre-right parties, namely the Slovak Democratic and Christian Union (SDKÚ–DS), Christian Democratic Movement (KDH) and Most–Híd. The parties agreed a common programme and allocated ministries, with SaS controlling four ministries as well as choosing the Speaker of the National Council. During the negotiations, Igor Matovič, one of the four MPs elected on the SaS list from the Ordinary People faction, alleged that he had been offered a bribe to destabilise the talks, prompting Sulík to make a formal complaint to the prosecutor. On 29 June 2010, the President decided that the 2009 referendum petition met the requirements and the vote would go ahead on 18 September 2010. Four of the six issues in the referendum were part of the agreed programme of the new coalition government. When the referendum was held in 2010, the turnout fell far below the 50% required.

2012 and 2016 parliamentary elections 
In February 2011, Igor Matovič was ejected from the caucus for voting for Smer–SD's proposed restrictions on dual nationality. Ordinary People filed to become an independent political party on 28 October 2011 and run as a separate list, along with two small conservative parties. In the 2012 parliamentary election, SaS received 5.9% of the vote, placing it the sixth-largest party in the National Council with 11 deputies.

In the 2014 European Parliament election, SaS came in sixth place nationally, receiving 6.7% of the vote and had one member elected as a Member of the European Parliament.

In the 2016 parliamentary election, the party received 12.1% of the vote, coming in as the second-largest party in the National Council with 21 deputies, exceeding expectations and making it the most successful election in SaS history.

Ideology and platform 
SaS has been variously described as liberal, classical liberal, conservative liberal, right-libertarian, national liberal, right-liberal, and libertarian. the party supports both cultural and economic liberalism in its policies. Economically rooted in neoliberalism and the Austrian School, the party believes in economic liberalisation and fiscal conservatism, being led by the father of Slovakia's flat tax, and SaS prides itself on economic expertise. In the 2010 parliamentary election, the party emphasised that it had economic policies completely opposed to those of the centre-left government of Robert Fico and ruled out cooperating with him. The party cites a need to close the budget deficit, and advocates reforming the social insurance system. Sulík's proposal for a welfare and tax system reform, the Contribution Bonus, is based on a combination of flat tax, basic income, and negative income tax; it aims to streamline the system and cut unnecessary expenses and bureaucratic overhead. SaS is notably civil libertarian, being the only major party to campaign for same-sex marriage or for the decriminalisation of cannabis, which put it at odds with its socially conservative past coalition partner, the Christian Democratic Movement (KDH). SaS is also notable for being the only party to be opposed to minimum wage increase, advocating instead for its abolition.

In regards to European Union (EU) politics, SaS is considered to be Eurosceptic or soft Eurosceptic, something to which the party has shifted the focus from its economic liberal, cultural liberal campaign with strong anti-corruption rhetoric, when Sulík opposed involvement in the Greek government-debt crisis and an EU bailout. The party characterizes itself as Eurorealist and opposes the bureaucratic machinery of the EU as presently organized. SaS opposed the Treaty of Lisbon, the EU economic harmonisation, and an increased EU budget; it is particularly wary of the EU restricting the free market. SaS opposed the European Central Bank's bailout of Greece during the 2010 European sovereign debt crisis, while Sulík has proposed drawing up plans to withdraw Slovakia from the Eurozone, in case of extraordinary circumstances in the monetary union. Sulík has also been a loud critic of mandatory refugee relocation programme as well as further European integration at the expense of nation-states.

In the European Parliament, SaS is a member of the European Conservatives and Reformists (ECR) group, which does not completely reject the idea of common Europe; party members consider the EU to be a good project, which requires reforms. As a response to Brexit, the party prepared a manifesto with several proposals to reform the European Union. Following the 2014 European election, party leader Richard Sulík questioned the involvement of SaS within the Alliance of Liberals and Democrats for Europe (ALDE) group, with speculation that the party could instead switch groups to join the ECR group. While Sulík joined the ALDE group as Member of European Parliament for the start of the 8th European Parliament, he later defected to the ECR on 2 October 2014.

Election results

National Council

European Parliament

Presidency

Regional presidency and council

Elected representatives 
After 2016 parliamentary election, Freedom and Solidarity had 21 members in the National Council. After some time, two of them, namely Martin Poliačik and Jozef Mihál left the party and its parliamentary club. The party has the following 19 members of the National Council:

 Ľubomír Galko
 Jana Kiššová
 Lucia Ďuriš Nicholsonová
 Jozef Rajtár
 Eugen Jurzyca
 Martin Klus
 Peter Osuský
 Ondrej Dostál (elected as a member of OKS on the SaS party list)
 Karol Galek
 Alojz Baránik
 Natália Blahová
 Renáta Kaščáková
 Miroslav Ivan
 Anna Zemanová
 Branislav Gröhling
 Milan Laurenčík
 Vladimír Sloboda
 Jana Cigániková (replaced Richard Sulík, who remained MEP)
 Radoslav Pavelka (replaced Juraj Droba, who became regional governor)

Notes

References

External links 
 Official website 
 Official party newspaper website 
 Promotional site of the 2009 national referendum 
 Entry in the Slovak official party register 
 Sloboda a Solidarita page on Facebook 
 Richard Sulík's homepage 
 
 

 
2009 establishments in Slovakia
European Conservatives and Reformists member parties
Eurosceptic parties in Slovakia
Liberal parties in Slovakia
Political parties established in 2009
Political parties supporting universal basic income